"Siri" (stylized as SIRI) is a song by American singer Romeo Santos and Dominican singer Chris Lebron. It is the sixth single for Santos' fifth studio album Formula, Vol. 3 (2022). The music video was released on November 22, 2022.

Charts

Certifications

References

2022 singles
2022 songs
Romeo Santos songs
Christian Nodal songs
Sony Music Latin singles
Songs written by Romeo Santos
Regional Mexican songs
Spanish-language songs